The Asus Transformer Pad TF103C is a 2-in-1 detachable tablet from the Asus Transformer Pad series.

Features 

It has a 1.86 GHz quad-core Intel Atom Bay Trail processor, 1GB of RAM, 16GB of internal storage, and a microSD card slot, which accepts cards of capacities up to 64GB. It has a 10.1 inch display of 1280x800.

Docking keyboard 
It includes a keyboard dock.

Software 
It includes Asus Zen interface.

It has Android 4 by default but can optionally be upgraded to Android 5.

In January 2022, mainline Linux support was added for the TF103C.

See also 

 Asus Transformer Pad TF701T
 Asus Transformer Pad TF300T

References 

Tablet computers
Android (operating system) devices
Asus products